Events from the year 1875 in Denmark.

Incumbents
 Monarch – Christian IX
 Prime minister – Christen Andreas Fonnesbech (until 11 June), J. B. S. Estrup

Events

 25 February  The Seamen's Association of 1856's new building in Christianshavn is inaugurated.
 1 January – the krone replaces the rigsdaler as the official currency of Denmark.
 11 June – Prime Minister Christen Andreas Fonnesbech resigns, and is replaced by J. B. S. Estrup.
 11 August – Hans Christian Andersen's funeral takes place in Church of Our Lady in Copenhagen.

Date unknown
 Aarhus Botanical Gardens is founded.
 Tegne- og Kunstindustriskolen, present-day Danmarks Designskole (Danish Design School), is founded.

Births
 3 February – Valdemar Andersen, illustrator and poster artist (died 1928)
 17 February – Princess Louise, later Princess of Schaumburg-Lippe (died 1906)
 1 March – Herman Vedel, painter and portraitist (died 1948)
 13 March – Axel Andersen Byrval, amateur football player and manager, national football team manager 1913–1915 and 1917–1918 (died 1957)
 4 May – Marius Lefèrve, gymnast, Olympic silver medalist in team, Swedish system, in 1912 (died 1958)
 19 May – Einar Hein, landscape painter associated with the "Skagen Painters" (died 1931)
 27 September – Heinrich Dohm, painter of portraits, genre works and religious paintings (died 1940)
 26 October – Hakon Andersen, organist and composer (died 1959)
 8 December – Frederik Buch, film actor of the silent film era (died 1925)
 10 December – Otto Scavenius, diplomat, Foreign Minister for one day during the Easter Crisis of 1920 (died 1945)
 23 December – Marie-Sophie Nielsen, communist leader and founding member of the Danish Socialist Workers Party and the Communist Party of Denmark (died 1951)

Deaths
 10 January – Anton Melbye, marine painter and daguerreotype photographer (born 1818)
 13 January – Georg Hilker, decorative painter during the Danish Golden Age (born 1807)
 6 February – Birgitte Andersen, stage actor and ballet dancer (born 1791)
 9 February – Rasmus Carl Stæger, judge, financial advisor to the government, entomologist (born 1800)
 15 March – Christian Julius Hansen, composer, organist, voice teacher and choirmaster (born 1814)
 13 April – P. C. Skovgaard, national romantic landscape painter (born 1817)
 4 August – Hans Christian Andersen, writer of plays, travelogues, novels, poems and fairy tales (born 1805)
 11 December – Frederik Ferdinand Helsted, painter and drawing master (born 1809)

References

 
1870s in Denmark
Denmark
Years of the 19th century in Denmark